Opals are gemstones.

Opals may also refer to:
OPALS, space experiment
Australia women's national basketball team
Opal's Steak House
OPALS, Ogren Plant Allergy Scale

See also
Opal (disambiguation)
Opel (disambiguation)
Opalski cells